Juan Isidro Jimenes Grullón (born in Santo Domingo, Dominican Republic on June 17, 1903 – August 10, 1983) was a Dominican essayist, historian, physician, philosopher, educator and politician.

Biography
Born to José Manuel Jimenes Domínguez (son of Juan Isidro Jimenes Pereyra and María Josefa de los Santos Domínguez Gómez) and María Filomena Grullón Ricardo. Jimenes completed his primary and secondary education in Santo Domingo, where he received a Bachelor of Arts. He then entered the Faculty of Law at the University of Santo Domingo, but his passion for philosophy made him abandon this  course. Pressured by his family, he left for Paris (1923) to study medicine. In 1929 he received his medical degree and returned to Santo Domingo the following year.

In 1934, Jimenes was discovered plotting against the dictator Rafael Leonidas Trujillo and was imprisoned and then exiled in 1935. He lived in Puerto Rico, Venezuela, the United States and Cuba where he remained in exile for twenty-six years while he continued to fight the tyranny of Trujillo. In 1941 while still in Cuba, he and other Dominican exiles on the island, founded the Dominican Revolutionary Party and the Dominican Patriotic Alliance. He participated in the failed expedition of Constanza, Maimon and Estero Hondo in 1959. Six months after Trujillo's assassination he returned to his country and immediately integrated plunged into national policy. In 1962, Jimenes was a candidate for the Presidency with the Social Democratic Alliance party.

He also taught history and sociology at the Autonomous University of Santo Domingo. He published twenty books in the fields of sociology, philosophy, history and literature. His works include the Dominican Republic: a fiction, Pedro Henríquez Ureña : Reality and Myth, Our fake left and the myth of the founding fathers, polemicist and reflect the rebellious spirit that characterized most of his essays production.

He died in Santo Domingo on August 10, 1983.

References

1903 births
1983 deaths
20th-century philosophers
Dominican Republic philosophers
Dominican Republic politicians
Dominican Republic male writers
People from Santo Domingo
Candidates for President of the Dominican Republic
Dominican Republic people of Canarian descent
Dominican Republic people of Venezuelan descent
20th-century Dominican Republic historians
White Dominicans